Shamsi (also Romanized as Shamsī; also known as Shamar and Shamsābād) is a village in Rostaq Rural District, in the Central District of Saduq County, Yazd Province, Iran. At the 2006 census, its population was 1,267, in 369 families.

References 

Populated places in Saduq County